Benin has sent athletes to every Summer Olympic Games held since 1980.  Under its previous name of Dahomey, the country also competed in 1972.  Despite appearing in twelve different Olympics, Benin has never won an Olympic medal.  No athletes from Benin have competed in any Winter Olympic Games.

Medal tables

Medals by Summer Games

See also
 List of flag bearers for Benin at the Olympics
 Benin at the Paralympics

External links